Tyler Dueck (born December 17, 1986) is a Canadian racing driver from Abbotsford, British Columbia.

Dueck came up through karting and the Jim Russell Racing School. He finished fourth in Formula Russell in 2006 and made two Skip Barber National Championship starts in 2007. He then turned his career to Europe where he raced in the Italian Formula Renault Championship in 2008 and 2009, finishing 27th and 5th in points in his two seasons, capturing the 2009 season opener at Monza. In 2010 he made six starts in the Italian Formula Three Championship for BVM – Target Racing with a best finish of tenth in the second race at Hockenheimring, good enough for 1 point and 22nd in the championship. He also made his Le Mans Series debut in the 2010 8 Hours of Castellet for the Swiss Race Performance outfit. Dueck qualified the car 18th overall (10th in class) but the entry was knocked out after 66 laps.

Dueck returned to North America and make his Firestone Indy Lights debut at Edmonton in his first race appearance of 2011 in July. The double-header in Edmonton would be Dueck's last professional race appearance.

References

External links

1986 births
Living people
Racing drivers from British Columbia
Italian Formula Renault 2.0 drivers
Italian Formula Three Championship drivers
European Le Mans Series drivers
Indy Lights drivers
Sportspeople from Abbotsford, British Columbia

BVM Target drivers
Cram Competition drivers